The holder of the British royal household post of His or Her Majesty's Representative at Ascot heads the Ascot Office at St. James's Palace and is responsible for admitting people to the Royal Enclosure at Ascot Racecourse.

List of representatives
Until 1901, the position was held by the Master of the Buckhounds.
Since then, the incumbents have been named individuals, as follows:
1901–1934: Victor Spencer, 3rd Baron Churchill (1st Viscount Churchill from 1902)
1934–1945: Gavin Hamilton, 2nd Baron Hamilton of Dalzell, KT
1945–1972: Bernard Fitzalan-Howard, 16th Duke of Norfolk, KG GCVO GBE PC
1972–1984: Lieutenant-Colonel John Nevill, 5th Marquess of Abergavenny, KG OBE
1984–1997: Colonel Sir Piers Bengough, KCVO OBE DL
1997–2011: Peregrine Cavendish, Marquess of Hartington (12th Duke of Devonshire from 2004), KCVO CBE DL
2011–2020: Sir Johnny Weatherby, KCVO 
2020–present: Sir Francis Brooke, Bt

See also
British Champions Day
List of British flat horse races

References

External links
Main Ascot website
Royal Ascot website
Royal Ascot Guide

Positions within the British Royal Household